Iuliana Enescu (born 10 October 1955) is a Romanian volleyball player. She competed in the women's tournament at the 1980 Summer Olympics.

References

1955 births
Living people
Romanian women's volleyball players
Olympic volleyball players of Romania
Volleyball players at the 1980 Summer Olympics
Sportspeople from Târgu Mureș